Joshua Keith Ostrander (born April 8), also known as Mondo Cozmo, is an American singer-songwriter and record producer from Philadelphia, Pennsylvania. He is now based in Los Angeles, California. His solo music has been described as "chorus-heavy folk-rock."

Biography and career

Laguardia (2000–2005) 
Ostrander fronted the alt-rock band Laguardia from 2000 to 2005. It included Joshua Ostrander, Greg Lyons, Lee Bernstein and Michael Morpurgo and was signed to Universal Records and Republic Records released the album Welcome to the Middle in 2003 with "Holy Ghost" from the album released as a single. Ostrander's band, Laguardia, should not be confused with the famous Spanish Pop rock band La Guardia active 1983–1997 and relaunched in 2003.

Eastern Conference Champions (2005–2015)
Ostrander later became the front man of Eastern Conference Champions (ECC), which he started with his friend and collaborator Greg Lyons from Laguardia and Vern Zaborowski from CKY. The band also included Melissa Dougherty. The band came about when Ostrander and Lyons signed with Geffen Records and released the EP called The Southampton Collection under the ECC moniker. Three studio albums followed: Ameritown in 2007, Santa Fe in 2009 and SPEAK-AHH in 2010, and a number of EPs as Eastern Conference Champions. ECC disbanded in August 2015.

Other collaborations
Along with producing their own releases, Ostrander produced for such bands as Voxhaul Broadcast and worked on projects with such producers as Brendan O'Brien, Owen Morris, Brad Wood, Thom Panunzio, Jimmy Jam and Terry Lewis. Ostrander works out of his downtown LA studio called Santa Fe Studios.

Mondo Cozmo (2015–present) 
Ostrander began recording under the name Mondo Cozmo in 2016, and his single "Shine" hit No. 1 on Billboard's Adult Alternative Songs chart in January 2017. His name comes from a combination of his dog's name, Cozmo, and the 1969 John Waters comedy "Mondo Trasho."
His debut album "Plastic Soul" was released on August 4, 2017.

Ostrander's debut headlining tour as Mondo Cozmo began on July 12, 2017 at the Exit/In in Nashville, Tennessee. The tour ran nineteen shows and concluded on October 28, 2017. The touring band was composed of Drew "The Kid" Beck on electric guitar, Chris Null on acoustic guitar and bass, James Gordon on synth and keys, and Andrew Tolman on drums. Mondo Cozmo continues to tour and opened for Vance Joy in summer 2018.

Discography

Albums
with Laguardia
2004: Welcome to the Middle, Universal Republic – Singer/Songwriter Co-Production

with Eastern Conference Champions
2005: The Southampton Collection, Geffen Records – Singer/Songwriter-Producer
2007: Ameritown, Interscope Records – Singer/Songwriter – Co-Production
2009: Santa Fe, RockHampton Records – Singer/Songwriter- Production
2010: SPEAK-AHH, RockHampton Records – Singer/Songwriter – Production

as Producer
2009: "Blaggers and Liars", KAV – 2009 – Producer/Engineer/Mixer
2009: "Fact, Fiction and Turquoise", Voxhaul Broadcast – Producer/Engineer/Mixer
2009: "Mios", Corband – Producer/Engineer/Mixer
2009: "Untitled", Two Years Before The Mast – Producer/Engineer/Mixer
2009: "Lay Alone" single, The Brothers Movement – Mixer
2010: "Untitled", KAV – 2010 – Producer/Engineer/Mixer
2017: "Plastic Soul", Republic Records - Producer
2020: “New Medicine”, Last Gang Records - Executive Producer
2022: "This Is For The Barbarians", Last Gang Records - Executive Producer

Singles
as Mondo Cozmo

Notes

References

External links

Interview: Josh Ostrander about Mondo Cozmo

Living people
Musicians from Philadelphia
Republic Records artists
Singer-songwriters from Pennsylvania
Place of birth missing (living people)
1979 births